Tequila is a distilled beverage made from the blue agave plant, primarily in the area surrounding the city of Tequila  northwest of Guadalajara, and in the Jaliscan Highlands (Los Altos de Jalisco) of the central western Mexican state of Jalisco.

The red volcanic soils in the region of Tequila are well suited for growing the blue agave, and more than 300 million of the plants are harvested there each year. Agave grows differently depending on the region. Blue agaves grown in the highlands Los Altos region are larger and sweeter in aroma and taste. Agaves harvested in the valley region have a more herbaceous fragrance and flavor. Due to its historical and cultural importance, the region near Tequila was declared a UNESCO World Heritage Site in 2006, the Agave Landscape and Ancient Industrial Facilities of Tequila.

Mexican laws state that tequila can be produced only in the state of Jalisco and limited municipalities in the states of Guanajuato, Michoacán, Nayarit, and Tamaulipas. Tequila is recognized as a Mexican designation of origin product in more than 40 countries. It was protected through NAFTA in Canada and the United States until July 2020, through bilateral agreements with individual countries such as Japan and Israel, and has been a protected designation of origin product in the European Union since 1997.

Aside from its geographical distinction, tequila is differentiated from mezcal in that it is made only from blue agave and the beverages are prepared in different ways. Tequila is commonly served neat in Mexico and as a shot with salt and lime around the world. Tequila must have between 35 and 55 percent alcohol content (70 and 110 U.S. proof).

History

Early history

The distillation technology to produce mezcal from agave heart juice was first introduced from the coastal regions of what was then Nueva Galicia (present-day Aguascalientes, Colima, Guanajuato, Jalisco, Nayarit, and Zacatecas) into the highland valleys of Amatitán, Tequila, Magdalena, and El Arenal in the mid-1700s. The mezcal produced in these regions became distinctive enough as to become known as "tequila" (after the town).

Spain's King Carlos IV granted the Cuervo family the first license to commercially make tequila. Don Cenobio Sauza, founder of Sauza Tequila and Municipal President of the Village of Tequila from 1884–1885, was the first to export tequila to the United States, and shortened the name from "Tequila Extract" to just "Tequila" for the American markets. Don Cenobio's grandson Don Francisco Javier gained international attention for insisting that "there cannot be tequila where there are no agaves!" His efforts led to the principle that real tequila can come only from the State of Jalisco.

The first tequila distillery in the United States was opened in 1936 in Nogales, Arizona by Harry J. Karns, former Arizona state senator and Nogales Mayor.

In a move to take ownership of the term "tequila", the Mexican government declared the term to be its intellectual property in 1974.

Recent history 

Although some tequilas have remained as family-owned brands, most well-known tequila brands are owned by large multinational corporations. However, over 100 distilleries make over 900 brands of tequila in Mexico and over 2,000 brand names have been registered (2009 statistics). Due to this, each bottle of tequila contains a serial number (NOM) denoting in which distillery the tequila was produced. Because only so many distilleries are used, multiple brands of tequila come from the same location.

In 2003, Mexico issued a proposal that would require all Mexican-made tequila be bottled in Mexico before being exported to other countries. The Mexican government said that bottling tequila in Mexico would guarantee its quality. Liquor companies in the United States said Mexico just wanted to create bottling jobs in their own country, and also claimed this rule would violate international trade agreements and was in discord with usual exporting practices worldwide. The proposal might have resulted in the loss of jobs at plants in California, Arkansas, Missouri, and Kentucky, because Mexican tequila exported in bulk to the United States is bottled in those plants. On January 17, 2006, the United States and Mexico signed an agreement allowing the continued bulk import of tequila into the United States. The agreement also created a "tequila bottlers registry" to identify approved bottlers of tequila and created an agency to monitor the registry.

The Tequila Regulatory Council of Mexico (TRCM) originally did not permit flavored tequila to carry the tequila name. In 2004, the Council decided to allow flavored tequila to be called tequila, with the exception of 100% agave tequila, which still cannot be flavored.

A new Norma Oficial Mexicana (NOM) for tequila (NOM-006-SCFI-2005) was issued in 2006, and among other changes, introduced a class of tequila called extra añejo or "ultra-aged" which must be aged a minimum of three years.

A one-liter bottle of limited-edition premium tequila was sold for $225,000 in July 2006 in Tequila, Jalisco, by the company Tequila Ley .925. The bottle which contained the tequila was a two-kilo display of platinum and gold. The manufacturer received a certificate from The Guinness World Records for the most expensive bottle of tequila spirit ever sold.

In June 2013, a Chinese ban on the importation of premium (100% blue agave) tequila into China was lifted, following a state visit to Mexico by Chinese Communist Party general secretary Xi Jinping. The entry of premium tequila into the country was expected to increase tequila exports by 20 percent within the decade above the 170 million liters in 2013. Ramon Gonzalez, director of the Consejo Regulador del Tequila, estimates that each of the top 16 producers of tequila had invested up to $3 million to enter the Chinese market. On 30 August 2013, the first 70,380 bottles of premium tequila from ten brands arrived in Shanghai. The arrival happened during an event held at the House of Roosevelt, a well-known club located on The Bund– an area with a long tradition of importing alcoholic beverages in China.

The latest version of the tequila standard (NOM-006-SCFI-2012) updated the standard to specify that the silver class of tequila cannot contain additives, to allow the aging time for the ultra-aged class to be displayed on the label, and to prohibit the selling of bulk tequila through vending machines, and required registering the agave during the calendar year of its plantation and required annual updates.

In 2018, the Mexican government approved a proposal to celebrate the third Saturday of March as National Tequila Day.

Production

Planting, tending, and harvesting the agave plant remains a manual effort, largely unchanged by modern farm machinery and relying on centuries-old know-how. The men who harvest it, the jimadores , have intimate knowledge of how the plants should be cultivated, passed down from generation to generation.

By regularly trimming any quiotes  (a several-meter high stalk that grows from the center of the plant), the jimadores prevent the agave from flowering and dying early, allowing it to fully ripen. The jimadores must be able to tell when each plant is ready to be harvested, and using a special knife called a coa (with a circular blade on a long pole), carefully cut away the leaves from the piña (the succulent core of the plant).

After harvesting, the piñas  are transported to ovens where they are slowly baked to break down their complex fructans into simple fructose. Then, the baked piñas are either shredded or mashed under a large stone wheel called a tahona . The pulp fiber, or bagazo , left behind is often reused as compost or animal feed, but can even be burnt as fuel or processed into paper. Some producers like to add a small amount of bagazo back into their fermentation tanks for a stronger agave flavor in the final product.

The extracted agave juice is then poured into either large wooden or stainless steel vats for several days to ferment, resulting in a wort, or mosto , with low alcohol content. This wort is then distilled once to produce what is called ordinario , and then a second time to produce clear "silver" tequila. Using at least two distillations is required by law. A few producers such as Casa Noble (for their "Crystal" expression) and Corzo (for their añejo expression) have experimented with distilling the product a third time, but this has not caught on as a trend, and some have said it removes too much of the agave flavor from the tequila. From there, the tequila is either bottled as silver tequila, or it is pumped into wooden barrels to age, where it develops a mellower flavor and amber color.

The differences in taste between tequila made from valley and highland agave plants can be noticeable. Plants grown in the highlands often yield sweeter and fruitier-tasting tequila, while valley agaves give the tequila an earthier flavor.

Fermentation
Unlike other tequila production steps, fermentation is one of the few steps out of the control of human beings. Fermentation is the conversion of sugars and carbohydrates to alcohol through yeast in anaerobic conditions, meaning that oxygen is not present during the process. Fermentation is also carried out in a non-aseptic environment which increases the bacterial activity of tequila. The participation of microorganisms from the environment (yeasts and bacteria) makes fermentation a spontaneous process which gives rise to many byproducts that contribute to the flavor and aroma of tequila.

During the fermentation process, inoculum is added to the batch to speed the rate of fermentation. When inoculum is added, fermentation can take approximately 20 hours to 3 days. If inoculum is not added, fermentation could take up to 7 days. The rate of fermentation is a key factor in the quality and flavor of tequila produced. Worts fermented slowly are best because the amount of organoleptic compounds produced is greater. The alcohol content at the end of fermentation lies between 4-9%.

Organoleptic compounds

Organoleptic compounds enhance flavor and aroma. These include fusel oil, methanol, aldehydes, organic acids and esters. Production of isoamyl and isobutyl alcohols begins after the sugar level is lowered substantially and continues for several hours after the alcoholic fermentation ends. In contrast, ethanol production begins in the first hours of the fermentation and ends with logarithmic yeast growth. The alcohol content in tequila is affected by three factors: the amount of isoamyl alcohol and isobutanol in the yeast strain, the carbon:nitrogen ratio (the higher the ratio, the more alcohol produced), and the temperature of fermentation.

The higher the temperature, the greater concentration of isobutyl and isoamyl alcohols produced. Although if temperatures are too high, this can cause the yeast to become less effective. Similarly, if the temperature is too low, the process occurs too slowly. This can become a large issue in Central Mexico, most precisely the city of Tequila, Jalisco, where most tequila is processed. The temperature in the city of Tequila can reach 31 °C. For this reason, tequila producers often use large stainless steel tanks for fermentation.

Yeast
The specific yeasts and the environments in which they act determine the resultant organoleptic combinations. The role of yeast is, through many enzymatic processes, to turn sugars and carbohydrates into alcohol. There are two steps, first in aerobic conditions, yeast is doubled in colony size every four hours. This process goes on for 24–48 hours. Next, yeast turns acetaldehyde into ethyl alcohol which is known as one of the organoleptic compounds produced in fermentation.

The two main categories of yeast used in tequila are commercial brewers yeast and yeast that comes from precultivated existing yeast that has been preserved. The use of either type of yeast can result in different end products of tequila.

Chemistry

Alcohol content 

Tequila is a distilled beverage that is made from the fermentation of the sugars found from the blue agave plant once it has been cooked, the main sugar being fructose. Through the fermentation process, many factors influence the higher alcohol content of tequila, which are molecules such as isobutyl alcohol and isoamyl alcohol, and ethanol. These parameters include the type of yeast strain, the age of the agave plant itself, temperature, and the carbon:nitrogen ratio.

However, the type of yeast strain used and the carbon:nitrogen factors have the biggest influence on the production of higher alcohols; this is not surprising as higher alcohol and ethanol production is an intrinsic property of the metabolism of each strain. The type of yeast most commonly found in tequila is Saccharomyces cerevisiae, which contains many strains. For example, CF1 agaves, a type of yeast, produces much more ethanol than a strain of CF2, as the two yeasts' metabolism mechanisms differ. This factor may be influenced from different agricultural practices that occur to cultivate the different yeasts strains. It was found that the higher the carbon:nitrogen ratio, the higher the production of higher alcohols such as isobutyl alcohol and isoamyl alcohol. A high ratio imparts that there is less nitrogen in the fermentation process, which results in deamination reactions of amino acids, leading to the synthesis of higher alcohols. The Ehrlich pathway is the name for this process, where alpha-keto acids are decarboxylated and transformed to aldehydes and to higher alcohols.

The temperature of the fermentation process also greatly affects the alcohol content of the resulting product. For example, a study conducted by Pinal et al. found that cultivating two strains at a temperature of 35 degrees as compared to a temperature of 30 degrees produced more isoamyl alcohol. The higher temperature suggests that this is a much more optimal condition for the yeast to ferment the distilled beverage.

Lastly the age of the agave plant itself: the older the plant, the greater the alcohol production. It was shown in a study that the concentration of amyl alcohol increased as the plant aged by a factor 30%. However, a higher concentration of methanol is found when using younger plants. This may be due to differences in agricultural practices that occur when taking care of plants of different ages.

Color 
Tequila comes in an abundant array of colors ranging from clear to a dark amber brown. The color of the tequila varies greatly depending on the aging process and the type of wood used for storage. The white version of tequila, known as silver tequila or blanco, is the product obtained without a (or with very short) aging process. As well, the spirit must contain 38–55% alcohol content, which is fermented from a wort that contains no less than 51% sugars from the agave plant. Silver/Blanco tequila provides the purest form as little aging has occurred. What is known as gold, joven or oro tequila is usually silver/blanco tequila with the addition of grain alcohols and caramel color; however, some higher-end gold tequilas may be a blend of silver/blanco and reposado. Rested (reposado) or aged tequila (añejo) is aged in wooden containers. The aging process can last between two months and three years and can create or enhance flavors and aromas. The aging process generally imparts a golden color.

Flavor and aroma 

There are more than 300 known compounds in tequila, many of which are produced during the fermentation process, the raw material used, and to a lesser degree during the maturation. The components that make up tequila do not act individually to give tequila its distinctive flavor and aroma, but rather, depend on the interaction and quantity of each volatile compound.  The volatile compounds responsible for the flavor and aroma profiles of the tequila are put into a category called organoleptic compounds and are known to increase in concentration with a slower fermentation process. The organoleptic compounds produced during fermentation include higher order alcohols, methanol, esters, carbonyls, terpenes, and furans.

Higher-order alcohols have a strong aroma, and the quantity present in each tequila depends on the carbon:nitrogen ratio and temperature during the cooking and fermentation processes. Some of the most common alcohols present other than ethanol are: isoamyl alcohol, isobutanol, and 1-propanol.  Methanol is thought to be mainly generated through hydrolysis of methylated pectin which is naturally present in the agave plant, but there has been speculation that it is also partly produced from the enzymatic reactions of yeast strains containing pectin methyl esterase enzyme, which break up the methoxyl group from the pectin.  Nearly 50 different esters are identified in tequila, which together give rise to the fruit-like flavors and smell.  One of the most abundant esters is ethyl acetate which is synthesized during fermentation by the yeast Saccharomyces cerevisiae, using alcohol transferase enzyme which links acetic acid to ethanol.

In general, the longer the controlled fermentation period, the higher yield of esters produced. During the fermentation process, ethanol is oxidized and one of the main compounds produced are acetaldehydes, which adds the flavor necessary for the final product of tequila.  For example, isovaleraldehyde seems to produce a sweet, cocoa, and chocolate-like flavor. 2 and 3-methylbutanal produce a malty flavor. The agave plant contains many phenolics such as vanillin and syringaldehydes which presents a strong and fruity or herbal aroma. It also contains eugenol which can deliver a hint of spicy flavor to the tequila. Since the production of tequila involves heating, Maillard browning reactions occur, and furans are produced during the thermal degradation of sugar. The most prominent furanic compounds include 2-furaldehyde and 5-methylfuraldehyde, which can contribute to the smoky flavor of tequila. Guaiacol also seems to contribute to Tequila's smoky flavor. Beta-demascenone contributes to the woody, floral taste of tequila.

Volatile compounds that contribute to the overall taste and aroma of tequila can be quantitatively assessed and evaluated by gas chromatography. Discrimination tests such as duo-trio and triangle tests are also used to evaluate the quality of the tequila.

Aging

Process 

If silver or white (Blanco) tequila is the desired final product, distillation is the final process it undergoes. Rested (Reposado) or aged (Añejo) tequila must be matured in 200-liter (or larger) white oak barrels for at least two months for the former and 12 months for the latter. There are, however, more than 50 different companies producing tequila in the Mexican province of Jalisco, with different maturation times according to the variety of tequila and desired quality of the final product.

All companies producing tequila have their aging processes regulated and fiscalized by the Mexican government.

Chemistry 
The maturation process causes four main chemical transformations to the tequila compounds: (1) decreasing of fusel oils by the char in barrels, which acts as an absorbing agent; (2) extraction of complex wood constituents by tequila, giving specific aroma and flavor to the final product; (3) reactions among the components of tequila, creating new chemical compounds; and (4) oxidation of the original contents of tequila and of those extracted from wood. The final results of these changes are increased concentrations of acids, esters and aldehydes, and a decrease in fusel oil concentration.

Reposado may be rested in oak barrels or casks as large as 20,000 liters (5,280 gallons), allowing for richer and more complex flavors. The preferred oak comes from the US, France, or Canada, and is usually white oak. Some companies char the wood to impart a smoky flavor or use barrels previously used with different kinds of alcohol (e.g. whiskey or wine). Some reposados can also be aged in new wood barrels to achieve the same woody flavor and smoothness, but in less time.

Añejos are often rested in barrels previously used to rest reposados. The barrels cannot be more than 600 liters (158 gallons), and most are in the 200-liter (52-gallon) range. Many of the barrels used are from whiskey distilleries in the US or Canada, and Jack Daniels barrels are especially popular. This treatment creates many of the aspects of the dark color and more complex flavors of the añejo tequila. After aging of at least one year, the añejo can be removed from the wood barrels and placed in stainless steel tanks to reduce the amount of evaporation that can occur in the barrels.

Threats to quality
TMA (tristeza y muerte de agave — "agave depression and death") is a blight that has reduced the production of the agave grown to produce tequila. This has resulted in lower production and higher prices throughout the early 21st century, and due to the long maturation of the plant, will likely continue to affect prices for years to come.

"Tequila worm" misconception 

Only certain mezcals, usually from the state of Oaxaca, are ever sold con gusano (with worm). They are added as a marketing gimmick and are not traditional. The tequila regulatory council does not allow gusanos or scorpions (which are sometimes also added to mezcals) to be included in tequila bottles. The worm in some mezcals is actually the larval form of the moth Hypopta agavis, which lives on the agave plant. Finding one in the plant during processing indicates an infestation and, correspondingly, a lower-quality product. However, the misconception that tequilas may contain worms continues, despite effort and marketing to represent tequila as a premium liquor.

Norma Oficial Mexicana 

The Norma Oficial Mexicana (NOM) applies to all processes and activities related to the supply of agave, production, bottling, marketing, information, and business practices linked to the distilled alcoholic beverage known as tequila. Tequila must be produced using agave of the species Tequilana Weber Blue variety, grown in the federal states and municipalities indicated in the Declaration.

Furthermore, the NOM establishes the technical specifications and legal requirements for the protection of the Appellation of Origin of "Tequila" in accordance with the current General Declaration of Protection of the Appellation of Origin of "Tequila", the Law, the Industrial Property Law, the Federal Consumer Protection Law and other related legal provisions.

All authentic, regulated tequilas will have a NOM identifier on the bottle. The important laws since 1990 were NOM-006-SCFI-1993, the later updates NOM-006-SCFI-1994 and NOM-006-SCFI-2005 and the most recent revision published on December 13, 2012, NOM-006-SCFI-2012.

The number after NOM is the distillery number, assigned by the government. NOM does not indicate the location of the distillery, merely the parent company or, in the case where a company leases space in a plant, the physical plant where the tequila was manufactured.

Storage condition 
Unlike wine, whose character may change in taste over time and storage conditions, tequila does not change much once bottled, even without ideal storage conditions, much like most other distilled spirits such as whiskey, rum, or vodka. The quality characteristics (flavor, aroma, color, etc.) of a tequila are primarily determined during its aging in wood barrels. To maintain the utmost quality though, some conditions should be met: a constant and moderate temperature (60 to 65 °F), protection from direct sunlight, and maintenance of the integrity of the seal of the bottle. Improper storage conditions will have more effect on the taste of aged tequila rather than the un-aged version, due to tannins and other compounds introduced into the spirit from the aging barrel. For instance, if stored in improper conditions, the dark and more complex flavors of the añejo tequila are more likely to be tainted than the blanco or the silver tequila.

Once the bottle is opened, the tequila will be subject to oxidation which will continue to happen even if no more oxygen is introduced. In addition, if the bottle has more room for air, the process of oxidation occurs faster on the liquor remaining inside the bottle. Therefore, it may be the best to consume the tequila within one or two years after opening. For the most part, the change in quality of tequila is due to extreme conditions of improper storage, not due to oxidation.

Types

The two basic categories of tequila are mixtos and 100% agave. Mixtos use no less than 51% agave, with other sugars making up the remainder. Mixtos use both glucose and fructose sugars.

There are also four categories for tequila, depending on the aging period:
Blanco  ("white") or plata  ("silver"): white spirit, unaged and bottled or stored immediately after distillation, or aged less than two months in stainless steel or neutral oak barrels
Reposado  ("rested"): aged a minimum of two months, but less than a year in oak barrels of any size
Añejo  ("aged" or "vintage"): aged a minimum of one year, but less than three years in small oak barrels
Extra Añejo ("extra aged" or "ultra aged"): aged a minimum of three years in oak barrels; this category was established in March 2006.

Brands 

The Consejo Regulador del Tequila (Tequila Regulatory Council) reported 1377 registered brands from 150 producers for the year 2013.

Serving 

In Mexico, the most traditional way to drink tequila is neat, without lime and salt. It is popular in some regions to drink fine tequila with a side of sangrita—a sweet, sour, and spicy drink typically made from orange juice, grenadine (or tomato juice), and hot chilli. Equal-sized shots of tequila and sangrita are sipped alternately, without salt or lime. Another popular drink in Mexico is the bandera (flag, in Spanish), named after the Flag of Mexico, it consists of three shot glasses, filled with lime juice (for the green), white tequila, and sangrita (for the red).

Outside Mexico, a single shot of tequila is often served with salt and a slice of lime or lemon. This is called tequila cruda and is sometimes referred to as "training wheels", "lick-sip-suck", or "lick-shoot-suck" (referring to the way in which the combination of ingredients is imbibed). The drinkers moisten the back of their hands below the index finger (usually by licking) and pour on the salt. Then the salt is licked off the hand, the tequila is drunk, and the fruit slice is quickly bitten. Groups of drinkers often do this simultaneously. Drinking tequila in this way is often erroneously called a Tequila Slammer, which is in fact a mix of tequila and carbonated drink. Though the traditional Mexican shot is tequila by itself, lime is the fruit of choice when a chaser must be used. The salt is believed to lessen the "burn" of the tequila and the sour fruit balances and enhances the flavor. In Germany and some other countries, tequila oro (gold) is often consumed with cinnamon on a slice of orange after, while tequila blanco (white) is consumed with salt and lime.

If the bottle of tequila does not state on the label that it is manufactured from 100% blue agave (no sugars added), then, by default, that tequila is a mixto (manufactured from at least 51% blue agave). Some tequila distilleries label their tequila as "made with blue agave" or "made from blue agave". However, the Tequila Regulatory Council has stated only tequilas distilled with 100% agave can be designated as "100% agave".

Many of the higher-quality, 100% agave tequilas do not impart significant alcohol burn, and drinking them with salt and lime is likely to remove much of the flavor. These tequilas are usually sipped from a snifter glass rather than a shot glass, and savoured instead of quickly gulped. Doing so allows the taster to detect subtler fragrances and flavors that would otherwise be missed.

Tequila glasses

When served neat (without any additional ingredients), tequila is most often served in a narrow shot glass called a caballito (little horse, in Spanish), but can often be found in anything from a snifter to a tumbler.

The Consejo Regulador del Tequila approved an "official tequila glass" in 2002 called the Ouverture Tequila glass, made by Riedel.

The margarita glass, frequently rimmed with salt or sugar, is a staple for the entire genre of tequila-based mixed drinks, including the margarita.

Cocktails
A variety of cocktails are made with tequila, including the margarita, a cocktail that helped make tequila popular in the United States. The traditional margarita uses tequila, Cointreau, and lime juice, though many variations exist. A popular cocktail in Mexico is the Paloma. Also, a number of martini variants involve tequila, and a large number of tequila drinks are made by adding fruit juice. These include the Tequila Sunrise and the Matador. Sodas and other carbonated drinks are a common mixer, as in the Tequila Slammer. Other popular cocktails are the Acapulco cocktail, Bloody Aztec Chimayó Cocktail, Mexican martini, Mojito Blanco and Vampiro.

Regulation outside of Mexico

Canada 
Under Canadian regulations (C.R.C., c.870, section B.02.90), any product labelled, advertised, or sold as Tequila must be manufactured in Mexico, as it would be for consumption in Mexico. However, once imported to Canada for sale, it is legal for Tequila to be diluted with distilled or otherwise purified water to adjust it to the desired strength and then sold.

United States 
Similar to the law of Canada, the U.S. law (27 CFR 5.22 (g)) says that tequila must be "manufactured in Mexico in compliance with the laws of Mexico regulating the manufacture of Tequila for consumption in that country."

See also

 Bacanora
 Beer in Mexico
 Excellia – a tequila range made from agave Tequilana Weber Blue
 Kahlúa
 Mexican cuisine
 Mexican wine
 Mezcal
 National Museum of Tequila
 Pulque
 Raicilla

References

External links

 National Chamber for the Tequila Industry
 Consejo Regulador del Tequila A.C.

 
Mexican alcoholic drinks
Mexican Designation of Origin
Mexican distilled drinks
Agave